Durga Das (23 November 1900 – 17 May 1974) was a veteran Indian journalist, author and a social worker who was the founding president of the Press Club of India. A longtime parliamentary correspondent and editor with the Associated Press of India, he worked in several newspaper publications, including The Statesman, The Times of India and lastly the Hindustan Times, serving as its editor-in-chief from 1957 till 1959 before he went on to establish his own news agency, India News and Feature Alliance (INFA) in late 1959. He had famously authored three books, Ram Rajya in Action (1956), India and the World (1958) and India From Curzon to Nehru and After (1969).

Early life and education 
Durga Das was born on 23 November 1900 in Aur, a village in present-day Jalandhar district in the Indian state of Punjab. He attended an Arya Samaj-run school in Jalandhar and graduated with a bachelor's degree from Dayanand Anglo Vedic College (now Government Islamia College) in late 1910s.

Career 
After graduating from Dayanand Anglo Vedic College, he joined the Associated Press of India in 1918 and served as its Parliamentary Correspondent till 1937. He later joined the Calcutta-based The Statesman as its Special Representative and worked there till 1943. In 1944, he joined the Hindustan Times and went on to serve as its editor-in-chief from 1957 till 1959, before taking temporary retirement to establish organizations like the Press Club of India and India News and Feature Alliance (INFA).

Personal life 
Das had married to Ratan Devi, and had four sons and two daughters from her. He liked playing tennis and enjoyed swimming. Due to his five decades long journalistic career, he personally knew numerous political figures, including Viscount Chelmsford, Louis Mountbatten, Bal Tilak, Mahatma Gandhi, Muhammad Ali Jinnah, Jawaharlal Nehru, Lal Bahadur Shastri and Indira Gandhi.

Death and legacy 
Durga Das died on 17 May 1974 due to cardiac arrest in New Delhi, India. The then Prime Minister Indira Gandhi sent condolences to his family. President V. V. Giri sent also sent condolences and described him as "one my best friends in life" and a "great journalist". The New York Times described him as the "Chronicler of the Freedom Movement for 50 Years". In 2003, nearly 29 years after his death, the Indian government led by Prime Minister Atal Bihari Vajpayee released a commemorative stamp in his honor.

References 

1900 births
1974 deaths